Djair Kaye de Brito (born 21 September 1971) is a Brazilian international footballer nicknamed Djair.

He has spent the majority of his career in Brazil (playing for Botafogo, Internacional, Fluminense, Flamengo, São Paulo, Cruzeiro, Corinthians, Atlético Mineiro, Madureira and Ituano), with brief stints in Switzerland (with St. Gallen), Italy (with Lazio) and Qatar (with Al-Kharitiyath). He won two caps for the national side, without scoring any goals.

References

External links

 
 
 

1971 births
Living people
Brazilian footballers
Brazilian football managers
Brazil international footballers
Brazil under-20 international footballers
Association football midfielders
Botafogo de Futebol e Regatas players
FC St. Gallen players
S.S. Lazio players
Sport Club Internacional players
Fluminense FC players
CR Flamengo footballers
São Paulo FC players
Cruzeiro Esporte Clube players
Al Kharaitiyat SC players
Sport Club Corinthians Paulista players
Clube Atlético Mineiro players
Duque de Caxias Futebol Clube players
Bangu Atlético Clube players
Brazilian expatriate footballers
Expatriate footballers in Switzerland
Expatriate footballers in Italy
Expatriate footballers in Qatar
Qatar Stars League players
Madureira Esporte Clube managers
Footballers from Rio de Janeiro (city)